The 1963 Segunda División de Chile was the 12th season of the Segunda División de Chile.

Green Cross was the tournament's winner.

Table

See also
Chilean football league system

References

External links
 RSSSF 1963

Segunda División de Chile (1952–1995) seasons
Primera B
Chil